Advances in Experimental Medicine and Biology is a peer-reviewed book series. It covers the broad fields of experimental medicine and biology. The series was established in 1967 and is published by Springer Nature. The editors-in-chief are Wim E. Crusio (French National Centre for Scientific Research and University of Bordeaux), Haidong Dong (Mayo Clinic), Heinfried H. Radeke (Goethe University), Nima Rezaei (Tehran University of Medical Sciences), Ortrud Steinlein (Ludwig Maximilian University of Munich), and  Junjie Xiao (Shanghai University).

Abstracting and indexing
The series is  abstracted and indexed in:
BIOSIS Previews
Embase
Index Medicus/MEDLINE/PubMed
Science Citation Index Expanded
Scopus

According to the Journal Citation Reports, the series has a 2020 impact factor of 3.650.

References

External links

Springer Science+Business Media academic journals
General medical journals
Monographic series
Irregular journals
English-language journals
Biology journals